Charles Nelson may refer to:

Charles P. Nelson (admiral) (1877–1935), U.S admiral
Charles Nelson (film editor) (1901–1997), film editor of A Song to Remember
Charles P. Nelson (congressman) (1907–1962), U.S. Representative from Maine
Charles E. Nelson (1882–1966), Wisconsin state assemblyman
Charles Nelson (prospector) (died 1897), namesake of Nelson, Nevada
Charles Nelson Reilly (1931–2007), game show host
Charles Nelson & Co Ltd, Warwickshire cement manufacturer
Charles Nelson (businessman) (1835–1891), proprietor of Nelson's Greenbrier Distillery
Charles Nelson (writer) (born 1942), American novelist
Chuck Nelson (born 1960), American football player
Charles Nelson (wide receiver), American player of Canadian football
Charles Alexander Nelson (1839–1933), United States librarian and bibliographer
Charles Nelson (volleyball) (born 1933), American former volleyball player
Charles A. Nelson III, American neuroscientist
Charles F. Nelson (1872–1940), Canadian politician
Charles J. Nelson, American diplomat

See also 
Charles L. Melson (1904–1981), vice admiral of the United States Navy
Ernest Charles Nelson (born 1951), botanist and author